Celenza may refer to:

 Celenza, Italian surname
 Celenza sul Trigno, populated place in Abruzzo, Italy
 Celenza Valfortore, populated place in Apulia, Italy

See also 

 Cerenzia